Roger Charles Carolin (born 1929) is a botanist, pteridologist and formerly an associate professor at Sydney University. He was appointed as a lecturer in botany at the University of Sydney in 1955  earned a Ph.D from Sydney University in 1962 with a thesis on the floral morphology of the campanales, and retired as an associate professor in 1989.

Much of his research focussed on the Campanulales, in the particular the families, Brunoniaceae and Goodeniaceae.  He co-authored the Flora of the Sydney Region (various editions: 1972–1993), and served on the editorial Committees for the Flora of Central Australia and the Flora of Australia. Carolin was the principal author of Flora of Australia Vol. 35. Brunoniaceae, Goodeniaceae (1992).

Some plants authored
Campanulaceae Isotoma luticola Carolin  Telopea 2 1980
Campanulaceae Wahlenbergia communis Carolin  Proceedings of the Linnean Society of New South Wales 89 1965 (synonym of Wahlenbergia capillaris (G.Lodd.) G.Don  
Campanulaceae Wahlenbergia graniticola Carolin  Proceedings of the Linnean Society of New South Wales 89 1965 
Campanulaceae Wahlenbergia planiflora P.J.Sm. subsp. longipila Carolin ex P.J.Sm. Telopea 5(1): 144. 1992
Campanulaceae Wahlenbergia queenslandica Carolin ex P.J.Sm.  Fl. S. Australia 3: 1381 (1986).
Campanulaceae Wahlenbergia scopulicola Carolin ex P.J.Sm.  Telopea 5(1): 111. 1992
Geraniaceae Erodium angustilobum Carolin  Proc. Linn. Soc. New South Wales 94: 212. 1970
Geraniaceae Erodium angustilobum Carolin   Proceedings of the Linnean Society of New South Wales 94 1969
Geraniaceae Erodium aureum Carolin  Proceedings of the Linnean Society of New South Wales 83 1958.

For a list of all plants authored by Carolin see International Plant Name Index.
See also :Category:Taxa named by Roger Charles Carolin

Some publications

Articles
(1954) 
 (1957) Cytological and hybridization studies in the genus Dianthus. New Phytologist, 56(1), 81–97.
(1960) Geraniaceae. Flora Malesiana-Series 1, Spermatophyta, 6(1), 445–449.
(1964) Notes on the genus Erodium L'Her. Australia. Proceedings of the Linnean Society of New South Wales, 88: 313–319.
(1965) The genus Geranium L. in the south western Pacific area. Proceedings of the Linnean Society of New South Wales, 89: 326–361.
(1987) 
(1987) "Notes on Portulacaceae from Argentina. Parodiana 3 (2): 329–332
(1990) "Nomenclatural notes and new taxa in the genus Goodenia (Goodeniaceae)". Telopea 3(4) : 517–570.

Books 
Beadle, NCW, OD Evans, RC Carolin. (1962) Handbook of the vascular plants of the Sydney district and Blue Mountains. Armidale,New South Wales, Brown Gem Print. 597 pp.
Beadle, NCW, OD Evans, RC Carolin. (1982) Flora of the Sydney region. Reed, Frenchs Forest. 720 pp. 16 pp. of plates: ill. (some col.), maps
Pellow, B.J., Henwood, M.J. Carolin, R.C. (2009) Flora of the Sydney Region, 5th Ed. A complete revision, Sydney University Press. 
Carolin, RC, P Clarke. (1991) Beach plants of south eastern Australia.  Sainty & Associates, Potts Point, NSW, Australia. 119 pp. 
 (1992) Brunoniaceae, Goodeniaceae. Flora of Australia Series, Vol 35. 
(2002) Encyclopedia of Discovery:Nature. 11 chapters. 
Dow, L. (1997)  Incredible plants. McGraw Hill. consulting editor: Roger Carolin 
(1981) Salt lakes & coolabahs : field trip 23, (30 August – 18 September) / leader: Roger Carolin

References

External links

Map of collected specimens for Carolin, R.C. (567 specimens), Australasian Virtual Herbarium

20th-century Australian botanists
Living people
1929 births